Kate Bushell (1983 – 15 November 1997) and Lyn Bryant (1956/1957 – 20 October 1998) were a schoolgirl and a woman murdered in separate, high-profile incidents in the West Country in 1997 and 1998 respectively. The similar circumstances of the murders led investigators to conclude that there is a high possibility the murders are linked, with both killed with knives while walking their dogs along isolated lanes within 75 miles of each other in south-west England. Bushell, only 14 years old, was found with her throat cut 300 yards (274 meters) from her home, with police saying the killing had been so brutal that the perpetrator may have had prior experience in slaughtering animals. Bryant was stabbed a number of times, and her killer had apparently returned to the scene four months later to place her missing glasses back at the site. The apparently motiveless killings, as well as their particularly brutal nature and apparent links, led to fears that a serial killer was at large in the south-west at the time, which were compounded by subsequent attacks on other women walking their dogs in the area.  Detectives had already warned after Bushell's murder that the offender appeared to be the kind who would soon kill again, and shortly after, Bryant was murdered.

Despite the murders being heavily publicised in the press and the media, and both having featured on Crimewatch appeals, the cases remain unsolved as of July 2022. They remain some of the United Kingdom's most notorious unsolved murders.

In 2018, it was revealed that a DNA profile had been isolated in the Bryant case, leading to renewed hopes that the perpetrator could be identified. The murders continue to receive considerable publicity, and there has been speculation that the murders could be linked to the similarly apparently motiveless killing of 66-year-old Helen Fleet, who was also walking her dog in Weston-super-Mare in 1987. If the perpetrator had killed all three victims, he would be an unidentified serial killer.

Murders

Bushell

14-year-old Bushell lived in Exwick, on the western edge of Exeter, Devon. On Saturday 15 November 1997 she set out to walk her neighbours' dog Gemma as planned, since they were away for the weekend. She walked up Exwick Lane, a narrow rural lane commonly used by dog walkers and Bushell herself. At 6 p.m., with Bushell having not returned home and it being dark, her mother and father drove up the lane in their car to search for her, and also contacted the police. They then searched the footpaths through the adjacent fields and at 7:30 p.m. her father found Gemma (the dog), and then saw that Bushell was lying dead next to her. Her throat had been cut.

Three suspicious figures were reported as being near the scene by witnesses: a vagrant, a man with a blue car parked on Exwick Lane yards from the murder site, and a man seen running from the scene. None of these individuals ever came forward to police, and police would later state that this indicated that they had "something to hide".

Most people in the community knew each other well, so it had been noted in the summer of that year that the vagrant had suddenly appeared in the area. In mid-September, a resident noted the unknown man walking past him as he walked his dog on a lane on the outskirts of Exwick. He was described as wearing a long, checky-brown coat with a big collar that was very tight to his neck, and he had long straggly hair. He was between 5 ft 10ins and 6 ft tall, and between 30 and 40 years of age. The witness said he got the impression the man had been sleeping rough in the area. The man was seen around the area several times by the same witness, and was described as always wearing the same big coat, even when it was hot. On the evening of Wednesday 12 November 1997, as the local resident again walked his dog down the lane, the vagrant suddenly came out from behind the trees and startled him. This was only three days before Bushell's murder, and only half a mile from her home, on a lane which she regularly walked down. On the weekend before Bushell's murder, a neighbour saw an orange or red tent pitched near to the spot Bushell was found killed, and it seemed unusual for someone to be camping on their own outside Exeter in mid-November.

On the day of the murder, Bushell had gone shopping with her mum in Exeter city centre. At 4:30 p.m. she left her house to walk Gemma, her next-door neighbours dog. At 4:55 p.m., a father and his children who were out walking at the same time passed Bushell as she walked her dog up Exwick Lane. A mother and her daughter driving down the lane at 5:00 p.m. reported passing Bushell and her dog as they drove towards Exwick. They noted that she was looking straight at them, which they thought was unusual, and slightly further up the road they saw a man stood by a small blue van that was parked on the southern side of the lane. It was parked facing away from Exwick, and police believe it may have been a blue Vauxhall Astra van. The witnesses questioned what the man was doing there, and said after they heard of the murder that they felt guilty that they had not gone back to help Bushell in some way. The location this sighting was reported was only 100 yards (91 meters) from where Bushell was found murdered, and it was the last sighting of her alive. The sighting was also made only minutes before Bushell's murder took place. About a quarter of an hour before this sighting was made, two other witnesses had driven down the lane and seen a blue Ford Fiesta parked in the opposite direction, and it was not known whether this was the same vehicle. The man did not come forward and neither he or his vehicle were traced.

Half an hour after Bushell was found dead and half a mile away, a man was seen running from the direction of the lane into Cornflower Hill in Exwick, while the police helicopter was circling above. Police did not know for sure if the sighting of the man was connected, and when Bushell's murder was featured on Crimewatch in January 1998 they appealed for him to come forward. He never did.

Bushell's murder made front-page news nationally, provoking a national outcry, and was described in an appeal on Crimewatch in January 1998 as one of those murder cases that "strike a nervous chord across the nation". As it was a child who was murdered, the case gained a particularly high amount of attention. It was noted on Crimewatch that the murder appeared to be the kind committed by a repeat offender, with viewers being told: "unless a viewer can help now, the killer might not be caught until he strikes again". The lead detective on the case, Mike Stephens, said that all the officers on the inquiry were concerned that the murder may just be the start of the killer's attacks. Bushell's murder featured on Crimewatch again on 22 September 1998, as part of the 'Still Unsolved' programme. At the conclusion of this second Crimewatch appeal, it was asked for any individuals who knew the identity of the killer to come forward before he committed another offence. Almost exactly one month after the appeal, Bryant was killed.

Bryant

On Tuesday 20 October 1998, 41-year-old mother-of-two Lyn Bryant was killed, and investigators quickly concluded her murder might be linked to Bushell's. At 2:30 p.m. she was found by a gate to a field near her home on the Roseland Peninsula in Cornwall, five miles south of Truro, by a holiday-maker driving past. As in Bushell's case, her dog was found unharmed next to her. She had been stabbed a number of times in her neck and chest and police called the murder "horrendous". She had almost certainly fought with her killer. She had been in contact with her attacker for a considerable amount of time, having been stabbed while standing and also in a horizontal position.

At around lunchtime that day, between about 12:30 and 12:45 p.m., a local woman driving on the nearby road from Truro and St. Mawes noticed a stranger walking down the road who she thought looked "odd". As she passed him in her vehicle, he looked straight at her, and this sighting was later the basis of a photofit. He was 5 ft 10ins, in his early 30s, with a square-ish jaw and dark eyebrows. Bryant drove to Chenoweth's garage at Ruan High Lanes and on the A3078 in her car and arrived at about 1 p.m., where she saw a friend and chatted with her. Whilst they were talking, at about 1:10 p.m., a small, scruffy white van turned into the garage and parked at a strange angle, facing towards Bryant's car. The driver was between 30 and 50 years old old, with a round face and a full bushy brown beard flecked with grey. He appeared quite big and seemed to be wearing a waxed green jacket. As soon as Bryant exited the petrol station, the unidentified van followed her out of the garage, which the employees of the garage thought odd. It was later discovered that the van had also been sighted on the Friday and Saturday before the murder, and that it had been sighted parked in the layby beside the chapel where she was found dead. The van was described as either an Austin Maestro, a Ford Escort or a Bedford van.

Bryant returned home but left again at 1:35 p.m. to walk her dog along Ruan High Lanes, which she walked on almost every day. She walked towards the Methodist chapel and then left towards Treworga. Then, between 1:45 and 2:00 p.m., a witness driving past saw Bryant speaking with a man outside the chapel, 100 yards (91 meters) from where she was later found dead. He was described as 5 ft 9ins, in his 30s, and wearing light clothing. A farmer moving his animals at the murder site did not report seeing Bryant at around 2:00 p.m., but she was then found dead at this location shortly after.

The possible links between Bushell and Bryant's murders were noted on Crimewatch on 10 November 1998, and the lead detective on the Bryant inquiry, Chris Boarland, said that there were "distinct possibilities that they are linked", although he said that the murder could also have merely been local in character. He also said that they were working closely with the Bushell investigation team. Both victims had been out walking their dogs in the south-west when they were attacked and brutally murdered, apparently without motive. Boarland said "I truly believe that if we don't catch this man there is every possibility that he will strike again". An appeal was made to doctors and psychiatrists who may have had a patient that may have been capable of such a violent crime, indicating that detectives thought the killer may have been mentally ill. It was concluded that the man in the white van was a strong suspect for the crime, and it was said that he did not appear to be local.

Bryant's murder made headline news and was heavily reported on in the press and media. The murder occurred at a time when other high-profile killings were in the news: ongoing at the time was the high-profile trial of Michael Stone for the Russell murders in Chillenden, Kent, and three days after Bryant was murdered, Stone was convicted of the crimes. A mother and her two daughters had been attacked by a man while out walking with their dog.

Bryant's glasses were missing from her body and were not initially found by investigators, which detectives noted on Crimewatch three weeks later.

Murder inquiries

Initial investigations

The police investigating Bushell's murder found a number of man-made dens in the area around where she was found dead. Police appealed for any children or adults who had used those to come forward and eliminate themselves from the inquiry. A black bin-liner was also found which contained an individual's personal effects, and some unidentified fingerprints were found on the bin-liner. On Crimewatch in January 1998, the lead detective Mike Stephens appealed to the community of Exwick directly, saying that someone in the community knew who the perpetrator was and requested that they helped bring him to justice. Despite the high profile of the Bushell case, and the appeal on Crimewatch in January 1998, the killer was not caught quickly. Another appeal was made on Crimewatch's 'Still Unsolved' programme on 22 September 1998, in which Stephens said he was "90% certain" that the killer was a local man or someone who had local knowledge. He also stated that the man was right handed, possibly the owner of a blue vehicle, and may have had prior experience of slaughtering animals, particularly sheep. A psychological profile of the killer was also revealed, which said the killer was likely:
Aged between 18 and 35
Someone with previous convictions, possibly for sexual offences
Someone with sexual and/or relationship difficulties
Someone who kept pornography 
Someone who may have shown cruelty to animals

Despite the high profile of Bushell's killing and the appeals, none of the three suspicious figures seen in the area of Bushell's murder (the Vagrant, the man by the vehicle 100 yards from the murder site, and the man running from the scene) came forward, and Mike Stephens stated in November 1998: "We must question why some of these people have not come forward." Of the man seen by the blue vehicle very close to the scene, he said: "Despite extensive publicity this individual has failed to come forward and may clearly be Kate's killer... we have to conclude after this period of time the individual has something to hide".

Police found nothing in Bryant's background that would lead them to believe that she could be the subject of such an attack. Detectives traced the owners of 8,000 similar vans to the one the suspect was seen driving in the area of Bryant's murder in Devon and Cornwall, but did not find the vehicle, indicating that the driver may have come from outside the area. A criminal profile of the killer in Bryant's case said that he would likely be: 
A loner
Not in a stable relationship 
Someone who has a hatred of women, which he may have expressed to friends or even psychiatrists

Detectives believed that Bryant did not know her killer. Lead detective Chris Boarland concluded: "This was a planned murder. It was not about Lynda Bryant. This is somebody who was looking for somebody in an isolated location." In both the Bushell and Bryant cases it was ultimately concluded that the motive was sexual, even though neither of the victims had been sexually assaulted. In both cases this was because of the way their clothes had been disturbed by her killer. The murders were described as "pretty unique nationally and internationally".

6,000 people were DNA tested in the first few years of the Bryant investigation, indicating that investigators had DNA evidence.

'Serial killer' fears
In early January 1999 a knife attack on a mother and her daughter in the area prompted fears of a serial killer being at large in the area, and that he was stalking women in the area. A man with a knife had deliberately driven his car into a 17-year-old girl and then drove her and her mother into a nearby field where they fought their way out of his car while he lashed out and slashed the mother's hands. The attack happened while they walked their dog in a country lane in Netherton, near Newton Abbot, Devon, and Devon and Cornwall police said the similarities between the incident and the two murders were "too obvious to ignore". The man had driven past them on the lane in a blue-grey Vauxhall Cavalier saloon, before coming up behind them again at slow speed several minutes later, before deliberately driving into the daughter's legs. The driver got out and held a knife to the girl's throat, saying he would cut her unless they did as he ordered.

The man matched the descriptions of the suspects in the two murders, described as white, 35 to 40, and of medium height. He was 5 ft 8ins tall and well-built, with short fair hair and with a roundish face.

In late January, there was another attack on a woman out walking her dog, 15 miles from the scene of Bryant's murder, and police also investigated whether her attack was linked to the murders. She had been attacked in a lane near Camborne, Cornwall, by a man driving a black vehicle. He was described as large, between 30 and 40, with light hair and wearing dark trousers and a light top.

Killer returns to Bryant crime scene, glasses found
In February 1999, four month's after Bryant's murder, it was reported that Bryant's missing glasses had turned up at the scene of her murder, despite the scene having been meticulously searched at the time of the killing and them not having been found. Detectives said they believed that the killer could have returned to the gateway where her body was found and placed her missing spectacles there. They had been found at the scene by a local man and given to the police. One possibility investigated by police was that the killer had returned them to the scene as he wanted to be caught.

Possible further attack
On 2 July 2000, there was an incident in which a woman was stalked for more than 300 yards by a man carrying a six-inch knife in Salcombe, Devon. Occurring at 7:30 p.m., her Alsatian dog barked at the man and he ran off. Detectives investigated whether the incident was linked to the murders. The man was white with a suntan, about 40 and clean shaven. He had got out of a dark blue Volvo car and was wearing green corduroy trousers and a blue sweatshirt.

Cold case investigations

Despite their high profile the cases eventually went cold, with both investigations remaining open.

Investigators found that a number of bright orange fibres had been left at or near the scene of Bushell's murder, and police continue to appeal for the public to come forward if they know of anyone who owned such orange clothing at the time. In 2014, it was revealed that these fibres had been contaminated in 1999 with purple fibres from a lab technician when the evidence was examined as part of a forensic review. This led to fears that a prosecution would no longer be possible, but police responded in 2014 by saying that it was still possible as some evidence was unaffected.

Over time, the cases have been speculatively linked to a number of known killers. In 2001, the two murders were linked to Philip Smith in the press, after he killed three women randomly in Birmingham. It was said that he regularly visited Devon and Cornwall with the fairground he worked for, and had a sister who lived in Exeter. In 2012, possible links between Bushell's murder and serial killer David Burgess (responsible for the Beenham murders) were investigated after it was discovered that he had been released from prison between 1996 and 1998, a time period in which Bushell was killed. No links were found to either of these killers.

New leads were investigated after a 20th anniversary appeal on Bushell's murder in 2017, but they did not lead anywhere. Detectives remained convinced that Bushell's killer had a local connection due to the location of the crime scene, which was an isolated rural spot mainly used as a cut-through and by local dog walkers. Detectives have also highlighted how the killer would have taken a knife with him that day to the scene, showing he set out to cause harm.

In October 2018, it was revealed that a partial DNA profile of the killer of Bryant had been isolated during a 2016 forensic review of the case. Detectives said that it could be used to eliminate suspects quickly, and revealed that they were re-testing some of the 6,000 people who had their DNA tested in the original investigation (the police had to destroy previous DNA evidence they had in 2013 due to a change in the law). It was also announced that three suspects arrested in the initial investigation had now been eliminated forensically. It was also said that three men of interest in the Bryant murder had still not been identified: the scruffy, bearded driver of the white van seen following her out of the garage, the man seen talking to her beside the chapel shortly before she was killed (the last known sighting of her), and a clean-shaven man wearing "normal clothes" who was seen by a farmer walking through a field away from the scene, which the farmer said was very unusual.

Detectives believe that the "most critical" sighting in the Bushell murder is of the man with the blue car 100 yard (91 meters) from the murder site.

There remains a £10,000 reward for information leading to the capture of the killer of Bushell. There is also a £10,000 reward for information leading to the capture of the killer of Bryant.

On 14 November 2022, Devon and Cornwall Police launched a renewed appeal to the public, appeal for information to find the killer of Exwick schoolgirl Kate Bushell who was murdered 25 years ago. It was stated that a substantial reward of £20,000 had also been offered by independent charity Crimestoppers for information which leads to the arrest and conviction of the offender. .

Lasting notoriety

Bushell's murder case is Devon and Cornwall Police's biggest and most high-profile murder investigation, with the investigation costing more than £1m by 2018. Bryant's case, meanwhile, had cost £2m by 2018. Both Bushell and Bryant's murders continue to be heavily featured in the news, and were heavily publicised on the 20-year anniversary of their killings in 2017 and 2018. Bushell and Bryant's murders are seen as some of the most notorious murders in Britain, and are seen as particularly notorious unsolved murders in the West Country.

In 2009, Bushell's case was discussed in detail in a chapter of a book by Vanessa Brown, titled Britain's Ten Most Wanted: The Truth Behind the Most Shocking Unsolved Murders.

The possible links between Bushell and Bryant's murders continue to be noted in the press and media, and in 2018, retired detective Chris Clark claimed that the two murders could be linked to the murder of 66-year-old Helen Fleet in Worlebury Woods, in Weston-super-Mare, in March 1987. She had also been randomly killed while out walking her dog, which was also left unharmed, and was not sexually assaulted or robbed. Clark claimed that there was a similar sighting of a pale van nearby.

See also
List of unsolved murders in the United Kingdom
Russell murders – similar, and contemporary, random murders of a mother and daughter walking with their dog in Kent in July 1996
Murders of Eve Stratford and Lynne Weedon – two separate unsolved UK murders from 1975 that have been proven by DNA to have been committed by the same person
Murders of Jacqueline Ansell-Lamb and Barbara Mayo – two separate unsolved UK murders from 1970 that are believed to have been committed by the same person
Murders of Janet Brown and Carolanne Jackson – two separate unsolved UK murders from 1995 and 1997 which may be linked
Murder of Ann Heron – another UK unsolved murder where key witness sightings reported seeing a mysterious blue Vauxhall Astra at the scene 

Other UK cold cases where the offender's DNA is known:
Murder of Deborah Linsley
Murder of Lindsay Rimer
Murder of Janet Brown
Murder of Linda Cook 
Murder of Melanie Hall
Batman rapist – subject to Britain's longest-running serial rape investigation

Notes

References

Sources

Further reading

External links
   Crimewatch appeal on Bushell's murder, January 1998 (03:10-14:45)
   Crimewatch: Still unsolved appeal on Bushell's murder, September 1998 (10:53-17:56)
    Crimewatch appeal on Bryant's murder, November 1998 (01:20-11:30)

1997 in England
1997 murders in the United Kingdom
1998 in England
1998 murders in the United Kingdom
20th-century English criminals
British male criminals
Crime in Cornwall
Crime in Devon
Deaths by person in England
English murder victims
English murderers of children
English victims of crime
Exeter
Female murder victims
November 1997 events in the United Kingdom
October 1998 events in the United Kingdom
Suspected serial killers
Unidentified British serial killers
Unsolved murders in England
Violence against children in England
Violence against women in England